Beet, Maize & Corn is the seventh studio album by London-based musical project The High Llamas, released on 7 October 2003 on Drag City. The style of the album is a notable departure from earlier High Llamas efforts, eschewing all electronic keyboards and effects in favor of a sound dominated by brass and strings.

Track listing
"Barny Mix" – 3:48
"Calloway" – 5:01
"The Click and the Fizz" – 4:01
"Porter Dimi" – 3:24
"Leaf and Lime" – 3:27
"Alexandra Line" – 0:19
"High on the Chalk" – 3:30
"Rotary Hop" – 5:11
"Ribbons and Hi-Hats" – 1:31
"The Holly Hills" – 1:50
"Monnie" – 3:44
"The Walworth River" – 4:37

References

2003 albums
The High Llamas albums